Manukau Rovers Rugby Football Club is a rugby union club based in Auckland, New Zealand. The club was established in 1885 and is affiliated with the Auckland Rugby Football Union. In 1912, the club seceded to rugby league, although after a few years returned to rugby union. Since 1972, the club have been based at Williams Park in Mangere, fielding numerous senior and junior teams, catering to both men and women.

Honours
Manukau have won the Gallaher Shield on three occasions, in 1968, 1973 and 2022.

All Blacks
The club have produced five All Blacks, the most recent of these being Frank Bunce. Others include Mack Herewini, Barry Thomas, Jack Dunn and Cyril Pepper.

External links
Club website
Auckland RFU club profile

Sport in Auckland
New Zealand rugby union teams
Māngere-Ōtāhuhu Local Board Area